West Islip Union Free School District, also known as the West Islip Public Schools, is a school district in Long Island, New York. It has its headquarters in the Michael & Christine Freyer Building in West Islip.

Schools
All schools are located in West Islip.

High school
 West Islip High School

Middle schools
 Beach Street Middle School
 Udall Road Middle School

Elementary schools
 Bayview Elementary School
 Paul J. Bellew Elementary School
 Manetuck Elementary School
 Oquenock Elementary School

Former schools
 Paul E. Kirdahy Elementary School (formally called Captree) (closed 2012)
 Westbrook Elementary School (closed 2012)
 Southgate Elementary School
 Paumonauk Elementary School
 Higbie Lane School (closed 1979)

References

Further reading
"West Islip to Vote on District Land Sale." Newsday. January 19, 1988. News p. 27.
"ASKS SCHOOL BOARD TO QUIT; District Superintendent Charges Laxity in West Islip Affairs." The New York Times. November 28, 1925.

External links

School districts in New York (state)
Islip (town), New York
Education in Suffolk County, New York